The 1992 Citizen Cup was the defender selection series regatta for the 1992 America's Cup, held in the United States. Two defense syndicates (featuring five IACC yachts) competed over four round robins in order earn a berth in the Citizen Cup finals; the winner earned the right to defend the America's Cup against the winner of the Louis Vuitton Cup (challenger selection series regatta).

Citizen Cup Competition
The 1992 Citizen Cup featured the emergence of the America3 Foundation syndicate headed by American businessman Bill Koch.

America3
The America3 syndicate included helmsman Buddy Melges, Gary Jobson, John Kostecki and Andreas Josenhans.

Teams

Round Robin 1

Round Robin 2

Round Robin 3

Round Robin 4

Finals
America3 held off a rally by Stars & Stripes to win the Citizen Cup.  America3 went on to successfully defend the 1992 America's Cup against Italy's Il Moro di Venezia V.

References

External links
America's Cup Official Website for the 32nd America's Cup in Valencia
CupInfo.com America's Cup News and Information for 2007
SAIL USA-11 Stars & Stripes USA-11

Citizen Cup
Citizen Cup
Citizen Cup (sailing)
Citizen Cup
Sailing competitions in the United States
Citizen Cup (sailing)